Chinchirusa (also spelled Chinchirosa) is a mountain in the Andes of Peru, about  high. It lies in the Junín Region, Yauli Province, Yauli District, and in the Lima Region, Huarochiri Province, Chicla District. Chinchirusa is situated near the Antikuna mountain pass, west of Tuku Mach'ay, and northeast of Chuqi Chukchu and Paraqti.

References

Mountains of Peru
Mountains of Junín Region
Mountains of Lima Region